Galena Lodge is a Nordic skiing and mountain biking recreation area in Blaine County, Idaho. It was established in 1976 at the location of the former mining town of Galena (1876-1890). The lodge operation is based on a special-use permit from the US Forest Service, the first one issued in the US for the Nordic ski resort. With almost 100 miles of trails for skiing and snowshoeing, the Ketchum/Sun Valley Nordic system is one of the largest ones in the United States.

Trails 
The first marked ski trails in the area appeared in the winter of 1974-1975 after a gentlemen's agreement was reached in 1973 to avoid conflicts between the snowmobile users and skiers by leaving the upper end of the Wood River Valley for an exclusive use of the skiers. By 1980 the trail network grew to 40 km of groomed trails. A 30-kilometer trail from Galena Lodge to North Fork Campground was fully cleared by the 1979, but at the time was only groomed before the Boulder Mountain Marathon Race; the construction of what is now known as a Harriman trail was completed in 2001. Work on the 47-mile summer trail system started in 2014.

Dogs are permitted on all trails. Season or day trail passes are required.

History

Mining town 
The mining town of Galena was established in 1879 (this allows it to claim the title of the earliest town in the Wood River Valley). Located close to few mines, including the Gladiator and Senate ones, at its heyday the town, with its population of 800, had its own post office, hotel, general store, multiple restaurants and saloons, a livery stable, a stage stable for a stage line to Hailey, and even a shoe shop. The industry consisted of a 30-ton smelter on a Senator Creek that did not produce much bullion.

The history of the mining town was brief: the last resident left in 1890, and Galena became a "ghost town". A small store survived for many more years, operating in the summertime. The swift demise was caused by the bad state of the mining business around: the mines turned out to be not as rich as they we expected to be, and an anticipated switch away from the silver standard forced the prices of silver to plummet in 1888.

Store 
Charles and Pearl Barber came to the area for fishing and ended up purchasing the store in 1923 for $500 (with just $50 down). The land belonged to the US Federal government that demanded from them to either fix or demolish the town buildings, as a result old Galena was erased from existence. With the development of the Sun Valley resort nearby, Barbers decided to expand their business by building 17 guest cabins. The plans were approved in 1941, but Charles at the time suffered a stroke and died in 1944. Pearl  continued to run the store business alone until 1960. After few changes of ownership, the place was purchased by the Gelsky family, who erected the Galena Lodge building.

Nordic resort 
The area was popular among the local skiers since the Barbers set up the lodge in 1936. Due to its higher elevation, Galena has earlier and better snow than Sun Valley, so the resort management occasionally brought guests to Galena for downhill and cross-country skiing. Barbers even installed a rope tow lift in the 1940s that for a couple of years serviced the beginners. In 1976 the Gelsky family sold the lodge to a group of seven owners that tried to capitalize on the newfound US interest in Nordic skiing and advertised Galena Lodge as a cross-country ski resort. After a brief ownership by the Fuller family, Galena Lodge was acquired by Steve Haims who invested heavily into the lodge and the system of trails. The Boulder Mountain Tour, a world-class ski race, was established in 1973. Still, the remote location made visiting the resort hard and created problems with the supply of electricity (the lodge was forced to use its own generator, power line only arrived at the lodge in 2004).

BCRD acquisition 
Unable to expand the business, Haims had hard time selling it. After 18 months of lodge standing empty, US Forest Service requested adherence to the permit that required 120 days of operation per year, and skiing community of Blaine County launched a donation drive in 1994 that yielded 500,000 dollars, amount sufficient for the Blaine County Recreation District (BCRD) to take over the building and the network of trails. $325,000, the entire original goal, were donated by Teresa Heinz in memory of her late husband, Senator John Heinz). Although BCRD is a tax-supported entity, a pledge was made at the time of no tax dollars going toward maintenance of the Galena Lodge, so the sustainability of the resort entirely depends on the use fees (65%, mostly from local skiers) and annual fundraisers.

References

Sources
 
 
 
 
 
 
 
 

Ski stadiums in the United States
Tourist attractions in Blaine County, Idaho